Steven Sogge (born April 20, 1947) is a former American football and baseball player.

Sogge played at the quarterback position for Gardena High School. He passed for 2,361 yards as a senior and was selected as a Parade All-American. In 2021, USA Today rated him as one of the ten greatest quarterbacks in California high school football history.

Sogge played at the quarterback position for the USC Trojans football team from 1966 to 1968. He was the starting quarterback of the 1967 USC Trojans football team that won the national championship and the 1968 team that was ranked No. 2 in the final Coaches Poll. He was also selected by the AP, UPI, and Pac-8 coaches as the first-team quarterback on the 1968 All-Pacific-8 Conference football team.

Sogge also played baseball as a catcher for USC. In January 1969, he signed a minor-league contract with the Los Angeles Dodgers. He played in the minor league for the Albuquerque Dodgers (1969), Spokane Indians (1970), and Tucson Toros (1971).

References

Living people
American football quarterbacks
USC Trojans football players
Players of American football from California
Albuquerque Dodgers players
Spokane Indians players
Tucson Toros players
Pan American Games medalists in baseball
Pan American Games gold medalists for the United States
Baseball players at the 1967 Pan American Games
Medalists at the 1967 Pan American Games
1947 births